China–Iran relations (Chinese: 中国–伊朗关系) are the economic, political, and social relations between China and Iran. Official relations began in 1937. The two civilizations have had a history of cultural, political, and economic exchanges along the Silk Road since at least 200 BC, and possibly earlier. They have developed a friendly economic and strategic relationship.

In March 2021, Iran and China signed a 25-year cooperation agreement that will strengthen the relations between the two countries and that will include “political, strategic and economic” components.

History
China-Persian relations (Chinese: 中国–波斯关系, Persian: [same as above]) refer to the historic diplomatic, cultural and economic relations between the cultures of China proper and Greater Iran, dating back to ancient times, since at least 200 B.C. The Parthians and Sassanid empires (occupying much of present Iran and Central Asia) had various contacts with the Han, Tang, Song, Yuan and Ming dynasties.

Han-Parthian era

The Han dynasty diplomat and explorer Zhang Qian, who visited neighboring Bactria and Sogdiana in 126 BCE, made the first known Chinese report on Parthia. In his accounts Parthia is named "Ānxí", a transliteration of "Arsacid", the name of the Parthian dynasty. Zhang Qian clearly identifies Parthia as an advanced urban civilization, whose development he equates to those of Dayuan (in Ferghana) and Daxia (in Bactria).

 "Anxi is situated several thousand li west of the region of the Great Yuezhi (in Transoxonia). The people are settled on the land, cultivating the fields and growing rice and wheat. They also make wine out of grapes. They have walled cities like the people of Dayuan (Ferghana), the region contains several hundred cities of various sizes. The coins of the country are made of silver and bear the face of the king. When the king dies, the currency is immediately changed and new coins issued with the face of his successor. The people keep records by writing on horizontal strips of leather. To the west lies Tiaozi (Mesopotamia) and to the north Yancai and Lixuan (Hyrcania)." (Shiji, 123, Zhang Qian quote, trans. Burton Watson).

Following Zhang Qian's embassy and report, the Han conquered Dayuan in the Han-Dayuan war and established the Protectorate of the Western Regions, thereby opening the Silk Road. Commercial relations between China, Central Asia, and Parthia flourished, as many Chinese missions were sent throughout the 1st century BCE: "The largest of these embassies to foreign states numbered several hundred persons, while even the smaller parties included over 100 members… In the course of one year anywhere from five to six to over ten parties would be sent out." (Shiji, trans. Burton Watson).The Parthians were apparently very intent on maintaining good relations with China and also sent their own embassies, starting around 110 BC: "When the Han envoy first visited the kingdom of Anxi (Parthia), the king of Anxi dispatched a party of 20,000 horsemen to meet them on the eastern border of the kingdom… When the Han envoys set out again to return to China, the king of Anxi dispatched envoys of his own to accompany them… The emperor was delighted at this." (Shiji, 123, trans. Burton Watson).

Parthians also played a role in the Silk Road transmission of Buddhism from Central Asia to China. An Shih Kao, a Parthian nobleman and Buddhist missionary, went to the Chinese capital Luoyang in 148 CE where he established temples and became the first man to translate Buddhist scriptures into Chinese. The Persianized kingdom of Kushan became the crossroads for Sino-Indian Buddhist transmissions, with many Iranians translating Sanskrit sutras into Chinese.

Sasanian era

Like their predecessors the Parthians, the Sassanian Empire maintained active foreign relations with China; ambassadors from Persia frequently traveled to China; Chinese whose documents record the reception of thirteen Sassanian embassies. Commercially, land and sea trade with China was important to both the Sassanian and Chinese Empires. Large numbers of Sassanian coins have been found in southern China confirming the existence of bilateral maritime trade.

On various occasions, Sassanian kings sent their most talented Persian musicians and dancers to the Chinese imperial court. Both empires benefited from trade along the Silk Road, and shared a common interest in preserving and protecting that trade. They cooperated in guarding the trade routes through central Asia, and both built outposts in border areas to keep caravans safe from nomadic tribes and bandits.

During the Liang dynasty in China, in 547 a Persian embassy paid tribute to the Liang, amber was recorded as originating from Persia by the Liang Shu (Book of Liang).

There are records of several joint Sassanian and Chinese efforts against their common Hephtalite enemy. Following encroachments by the nomadic Turkic on states in Central Asia, an apparent collaboration between Chinese and Sassanian forces repelled the Turkic advances. Documents from Mount Mogh also note the presence of a Chinese general in the service of the king of Sogdiana at the time of the Arab incursion.

The last members of the Sassanian Empire's royal family fled to Tang China. Following the conquest of Iran by Muslim Arabs, Peroz III, the son of Yazdegerd III, escaped, along with a few Persian nobles and took refuge in the Chinese imperial court. Both Peroz and his son Narsieh (Chinese neh-shie) were given high titles at the Tang court. At least on two occasions, the last possibly in 670, Chinese troops were sent with Peroz to help him against the Arabs restore him to the Sassanian throne, with mixed results. One possibly ended up in a short rule of Peroz in Sakastan (modern Sistan) from which a little numismatic evidence remains. Narsieh later attained the position of commander of the Chinese imperial guards and his descendants lived in China as respected princes.

Tang and Islamic golden age

After the Islamic conquest of Persia, Persia continued to flourish during the Islamic Golden Age, and its relations with China continued. In 751, the Abbasid Caliphate, which ruled Persia, was in dispute with the Tang dynasty of China over the control of the Syr Darya region during the Battle of Talas. The commander of the Abbasid army was Zayid ibn Salih, a Persian, and the commanders of the Tang army were Gao Xianzhi, a Goguryo Korean, alongside Li Siye and Duan Xiushi, both Chinese. After the Abbasids won the battle, relations improved, and there were no more conflicts between China and the Persians.

Zoroastrianism, Manichaeism and polo were exported to the Tang.

Mongol Yuan
A large number of Central Asian and Persian soldiers, experts, and artisans were recruited by the Mongol empire Yuan dynasty of China. Some of them, known as semu ("assorted officials") occupied important official posts in the Yuan state administration. One of the most famous settlers from Persia was Sayyid Ajjal Shams al-Din Omar, who is identified as an ancestor of many Chinese Hui lineages and that of Yunnan's Panthay Hui population. His most famous descendant was Zheng He, who became the Ming dynasty's most famous explorer.

During the Mongol-Yuan period, Persian was the lingua franca of Central Asia, and many Persians and Central Asians migrated to China. There was a large Persian community in China, especially among Chinese Muslims, that Persian was one of the official languages of the Yuan dynasty, alongside Chinese and Mongolian.

The Chinese Yuan and Persian Ilkhanate enjoyed close relations, with nearly annual diplomatic exchanges between the two.

In 1289 Kublai Khan established a Muslim university in Beijing. Persian works were translated en masse into Chinese, some of which are preserved today by the Peking University Library. Many tombstones and archaeological tablets found in China are also probably written in the Perso-Arabic script.

China exported astronomical tools and discoveries, printing, paper money, sancai, porcelain to Persia. Porcelain particularly grew popular among Persians.

Ming dynasty

The famous Maragheh observatory in Maragheh, Iran, is also known to have had some Chinese astronomers working there alongside Iranian astronomers, and some Iranian astronomical instruments were also being used by astronomers in China. Safavid Iranian art was also partly influenced by Chinese art to an extent. Shah Abbas had hundreds of Chinese artisans in his capital Esfahan. Also, 300 Chinese potters produced glazed tile buildings, and hundreds of others produced metalwork, miniature paintings, calligraphy, glasswork, tile work, and pottery. From E. Sykes's "Persia and Its People": "Early in the seventeenth century, Shah Abbas imported Chinese workmen into his country to teach his subjects the art of making porcelain, and the Chinese influence is very strong in the designs on this ware. Chinese marks are also copied, so that to scratch an article is sometimes the only means of proving it to be of Persian manufacture, for the Chinese glaze, hard as iron, will take no mark."

Of the Chinese Lin family in Quanzhou, Lin Nu, the son of Lin Lu, visited Hormuz in Persia in 1376, married a Persian or an Arab girl, and brought her back to Quanzhou. Lin Nu was the ancestor of the Ming Dynasty reformer Li Zhi.

Notable Chinese Muslims who undertook the task of translation of Persian into Chinese include Chang Zhimei (medicine) and Liu Zhi. Although Persian was still spoken among some Muslim communities, due to decreased contact with the Middle East, language use declined.

Ming navy general Zheng He came from a Muslim family and sailed through much of the Old World, including India, Persia, Arabia, and Africa. In his wake, he left many relics, including the Chinese-Persian-Tamil Galle Trilingual Inscription, praising the Buddha, Allah, and Vishnu respectively in the three languages.

Qing dynasty
By the Qing, although hardly anyone in the court was fluent in Persian, in madrasas, Persian was still studied. In particular, the works of Sadi, Abd-Allāh Abū Bāker, Ḥosayn b. ʿĀlem Ḥosaynī, etc. were taught in said madrasas.

Modern China
Diplomatic links between China and Iran have been maintained into the 20th and 21st centuries with the formation of both the People's Republic of China and the Islamic Republic of Iran, in 1949 and 1979 respectively.

In July 2019, Iran approved visa-free travel for all Chinese citizens, including those in Hong Kong and Macau, with China being one of twelve countries to have direct visa-free access to Iran.

In June 2020, Iran was one of 53 countries that backed the Hong Kong national security law at the United Nations Human Rights Council. The relationship between both countries include also soft-power and digital diplomacy.

In March 2021, the two countries signed a 25-year cooperation agreement.

On March 10, 2023, Iran and Saudi Arabia announced that they would normalize their relations in a deal brokered by China.

Economy
In fact after the JCPOA was signed in July 2015, China and Iran agreed to expand trade relations to $600 billion in ten years from January 2016, on the occasion when Chinese leader Xi Jinping paid Hassan Rouhani a state visit. This constitutes an increase of over 1,000%. The agreement was concordant with One Belt, One Road framework. A total of 17 agreements were signed, including one which relates to the Iranian nuclear program. The Chinese will help connect Tehran with Mashhad via their high-speed rail technology.

Oil and gas

One of the main pillars of the relationship is oil and gas. China switched to petroleum primarily to move its energy supply from coal. There was a rapid increase in oil importation from 1974 into the 1990s. In 2011, approximately 10% of China's oil imports were from Iran. Approximately 80% of China's total imports from Iran are oil and the rest is mineral and chemical products.  Because of this reliance on Iranian oil and gas, China is now investing in the modernization of Iran's oil and gas sector to secure access to the resource. The China National Petroleum Corporation (CNPC) was granted an $85 million contract to drill 19 wells in the natural gas fields in Southern Iran and signed another similar $13 million contract. Then again in 2004, an agreement was reached where China would import 270 million tons of natural gas over 30 years from South Par fields which is the richest natural gas fields in the world for $70 billion. Another Chinese company, Sinopec Group, gets half-share in Yardarvaran oil fields worth about 100 billion for the purpose of exploration. Later in 2007, CNPC signed a $3.6 billion deal to develop offshore gas fields in Iran and then signed another $2 billion contract to develop the northern Iranian oil field near Ahvaz. Not only is China helping to develop the oil and gas sector, but China supports Iran's ambitions to bring Caspian Sea oil and gas to Southern Iranian ports through pipelines so the resources can be exported to Europe and Asia. Iran relies upon its oil sales to China to ensure its fiscal well-being. China also sells gasoline to Iran despite international pressures that have halted Iran's ability to get gasoline from other suppliers.

China considers Iran a permanent partner for its exports and a source of its growing energy demand. In March 2004, Zhuhai Zhenrong Corporation, a Chinese state-run company, signed a 25-year contract to import 110 million metric tons of Liquefied Natural Gas (LNG) from Iran. This was followed by another contract between Sinopec and Iran LNG, signed in October of the same year. The deal, worth $100 billion, adds an extra 250 million tons of LNG to China's energy supply, to be extracted from Iran's Yadavaran field over a 25-year period. In January 2009, Iran and China signed a $1.76bn contract for the initial development of the North Azadegan oil field in western Iran. In March the two countries struck a three-year $3.39 billion deal to produce liquefied natural gas in Iran's mammoth South Pars natural gas field.  Because of its limited refining capacity, Iran imports one-third of its refined products such as petrol from China.

In 2011, the group Green Experts of Iran reported that Beijing and Tehran had signed an extensive deal that would give China exclusive rights to several Iranian oil and natural gas fields through 2024. Under the terms of the deal, Iran will give Chinese oil companies exclusive rights to three large regions of Iranian land as well as the rights to build all necessary infrastructure for these regions, all of which sit atop of large oil and natural gas fields. In return, China promises to treat any foreign attack against these regions as attacks against its own sovereign territory, and will defend them as such. China will have no need for prior permission from the Iranian government to maintain and increase its military presence in Iran, and will control the movement of Iranians in and out of these territories.

China has been Iran's crude oil sink since the JCPOA was signed. In 2017, 64% of an export total $16.9 billion with China was crude oil.

Trade
During the Cold War there were unofficial trade relations between Iran and China that have steadily increased over time. Trade reached $1.627 billion in the 1980s and $15 billion in 2007. In 2001, the volume of trade between Iran and China stood at roughly $3.3 billion, and in 2005, the volume of China-Iranian trade hit $9.2 billion. Iran's Deputy Minister of Commerce Mehdi Ghazanfari speculated that trade exchanges between Iran and China would exceed $25 billion in 2008.

In 2005, exports from China represented 8.3% of the total import market in Iran, giving China the second largest share of the market after Germany.  China's exports to Iran have experienced particularly rapid growth in the past five years, with China replacing Japan as the world's second largest exporter to Iran. Iran's imports from China rose by 360% between 2000 and 2005. China is now responsible for about 9.5% of all Iranian imports. In 1988, the Iranian market opened up to Chinese industry when the PRC began economic restructuring.

Once profitable trade relations were established, the PRC invested in Tehran's subway systems, dams, fishery, and cement factories while Iran helped supply China with the highly desired minerals coal, zinc, lead, and copper. Trade between the two states also included power generation, mining, and transportation equipment along with arms and consumer goods such as electronics, auto parts, and toys. Iran is full of Chinese products and cars.

Iran–China trade value reached $45 billion in 2011 and was expected to increase to $50 billion by 2012.

Ali Akbar Salehi, Iran's former representative to the International Atomic Energy Agency, said that the two countries "mutually complement each other. They have industry and we have energy resources".

In January 2023, The Overseeing Chief of the Chabahar Free Zone Organization Amir Moghaddam reported that the primary holder dispatch leaving from China docked at Iran's key harbor of Chabahar, marking the foundation of the direct coordinate shipping line between China and Iran's southeastern seaport. He said that Chinese ships already emptied in Bandar Abbas, the capital city of the southern area of Hormuzgan, with their cargos at that point being exchanged to Chabahar in Sistan-Baluchistan Territory by means of little ships. With the foundation of the coordinated shipping line between China and Chabahar, cargos are conveyed ten days prior, whereas fetched of stacking and emptying is decreased by 400 dollars per holder, the official clarified.

Infrastructure
Line 5 of the Tehran metro began operating in 1999 and was Iran's first metro system. The line was constructed by the Chinese company NORINCO.

New Silk Road

As of 2019, Iran has signed onto Chinese leader Xi Jinping's signature One Belt One Road plan, and Iran is considered to be a key part of China's geopolitical ambitions in central Asia and the Middle East, sometimes described in terms of a new Great Game.

While cargoes are usually shipped between China and Iran by ship, it is also possible to travel between the two countries by train, via Kazakhstan and Turkmenistan (see Eurasian Land Bridge). In 2016, a first direct container train between Yiwu (Zhejiang Province) and Teheran made its way across Asia in 14 days. This is supposed to be the beginning of regular container train service along this route.

Iranians and Chinese are currently renovating rails to connect Ürümqi to Tehran as well as connect Kazakhstan, Kyrgyzstan, Uzbekistan and Turkmenistan (also see Five-nations railway, Afghanistan–China relations). In another 2016 test run, it took 12 days to deliver freight from Shanghai to Tehran, whereas it would have taken 30 days by sea.

In May 2018, China planned to build a new freight train line with Iran. In 2020, a leaked document showed that a 25-year strategic partnership would be implemented between the two countries, in which China would invest in Iranian infrastructure, transport and seaports, in exchange, Iran would provide a heavily discounted regular supply of its oil. Above all the reasons for the timing of this agreement is the rivalry between the US, the main opponent to Iran, and China, the main supporter to Iran, plays the major role in taking the step of signing the agreement.

Politics
Open mutual support is seen in Iran's support of the action at Tiananmen Square and Chinese condemnation of the United States' attack on an Iranian passenger plane, among other things.

Military
China is believed to have helped Iran militarily in the following areas: conducting training of high-level officials on advanced systems, providing technical support, supplying specialty steel for missile construction, providing control technology for missile development, and building a missile factory and test range. It is rumored that China is responsible for aiding in the development of advanced conventional weapons including surface-to-air missiles, combat aircraft, radar systems, and fast-attack missile vessels.

It was not until the 1990s that the relationship between China and Iran came under close scrutiny by the United States. From this scrutiny, it became known that China was using North Korea to traffic arms during the Iran-Iraq war to avoid antagonizing the West but later cut out the middle man. In the years of 1984–1986, about $1–2 billion worth of arms sales occurred. And then in 1986, Iran obtained Chinese-made anti-ship surface-to-surface missiles that posed a threat to Persian Gulf shipping. In possessing these missiles, Iran is able to control the Strait of Hormuz and all of the naval trade to and from the Gulf countries.

In later inquiries, it was discovered that China sold Iran precursor and dual-use chemicals and the technology and equipment needed to use them. In 1996, the Washington Post reported that China was supplying chemical weapons plants in Iran that were destined for the Army. Arms exports began to steadily decline in the 1990s yet China engaged in $400 million worth of arms transfer agreements with Iran. Sales increased to $600 million from 1997 to 2000. On average, it is estimated that China made $171 million per year in arms exports to Iran since 1982.

China and Iran held their first joint naval drill in 2017.

Since coming to office, Iran's President Ebrahim Raisi in 2021, has pursued a "look east" policy to deepen ties with China and Russia. Tehran joined the Shanghai Cooperation Organisation in September 2021. In January 2022 Iran, China and Russia held their third joint naval drills in the northern Indian Ocean. The three countries started joint naval drills in 2019 in the Indian Ocean and the Sea of Oman area. The purpose of this drill is to strengthen security and its foundations in the region, and to expand multilateral cooperation between the three countries to jointly support world peace, maritime security and create a maritime community with a common future.

Nuclear technology
Nuclear cooperation began in the 1980s when China helped build a research reactor and supply four other research reactors. Continued aid came in the form of helping Iran construct a uranium hexafluoride enrichment plant near Isfahan and the resumption of construction on a nuclear power plant at Bushehr that was left uncompleted by the French and Germans. In 1991, nuclear exports to Iran were discovered by the International Atomic Energy Association, which contained three types of uranium. A 1990 covert nuclear agreement was also discovered. This discovery was followed by an unprecedented nuclear cooperation agreement in 1992. The agreement was signed despite U.S. protests to have China limit its nuclear cooperation with Iran.

Direct nuclear cooperation has ended but there is speculation over whether there remains indirect nuclear cooperation. For example, in 2005 seven Chinese firms were suspected of selling nuclear weapons technology and all 7 had sanctions placed upon them. Those firms were banned from trading with the United States for two years. There also continues to be Chinese nuclear experts, scientists, and technicians present in Iran.

In 2015 China was part of the Iran nuclear deal framework. Now, China opposes Iran's possible production and possession of nuclear weapons but does not see the urgency to stop it.

16 Nov 2021 United States President Joe Biden and Chinese President Xi Jinping talked about their positions in the resumption of negotiations with Iran on reviving the 2015 nuclear deal. While China favours reviving the agreement, it has tended to place the onus on the United States and blames Washington for having abandoned it.

UN sanctions
At first Iran did not originally support China's bid for United Nations membership but did not veto. It wasn't until 1969 that Iran displayed open support for China's membership. Now, Iran relies on China's membership and especially Chinese veto power on the Security Council to protect it from US-led sanctions.

China is known for its preference of diplomacy over sanctions. This tradition includes China's (along with Russia's) opposition to UN sanctions against Iran. In 1980, China refused to support the UN arms embargo against Iran and further abstained from voting on US sanctions against Iran.

Only in 2010 under US pressure, did China join Russia to support the UN sanctions on Iran.

In 2018 the US ordered Canada to arrest and detain Meng Wanzhou, CFO of Huawei, for 'illegally dealing with' and allegedly violating sanctions against Iran.

Ideology

On 1 June 1920, a friendship agreement was signed between the Beiyang government and Qajar Persia. Ratifications were exchanged on 6 February 1922, with effect on the same day. Official diplomatic relations were established in 1937 with Li Tieh-tseng served as ambassador representing the Republic of China. Prior to 1971, an unofficial relationship existed out of necessity. From this emerged the current relationship. The first Iranian embassy was formed in December 1973 and Abbas Aram was appointed to the post, becoming the first Iranian diplomat to serve in China though the first embassy opened in 1942. The Shah visited Taiwan to meet the President of China Chiang Kai-shek in 1958. In 1971, Imperial Iran supported Red China's bid for a permanent seat in the United Nations General Assembly Resolution 2758 and it voted in favour to admit Beijing and replace Taipei. China was invited to 2,500-year celebration of the Persian Empire. Iran recognized the People's Republic of China in 1971 with Chinese Communist Party chairman and Chinese Premier Hua Guofeng was one of the last foreign leaders to visit the Shah of Iran, before he was overthrown in 1979. In the 1980s, the shared ideological themes of anti-imperialism and third world solidarity helped solidify the relationship but they became allies as a way to counterbalance the Soviet Union and the United States during the Cold War. When the USSR signed the Soviet-Indian friendship treaty, the relationship became a way to counter increasing Russian influence in the Persian Gulf. But there remained some distance between Mao's regime and that of the Shah because of ideology. The Shah was friendly towards the United States and Mao was a communist. The Shah also feared that the relationship could rally his communist opposition. Once the Shah was overthrown during the Islamic Revolution, China quickly recognized the new government on 14 February 1979. China was put into a difficult situation during the Iran–Iraq War in 1980 since China was allied with both nations. China was able to remain outside of the conflict and push for a peaceful resolution to the conflict.

Since Iran no longer recognizes the ROC, now residing in Taiwan, its representation is held by the Taipei Economic and Cultural Representative Office in the Kingdom of Saudi Arabia in Riyadh.

China has been at times careful in its deals with Iran while simultaneously trying not to antagonize China's relationship with the U.S. as well as its growing relations with Israel. The China's approach toward the Israel-Iran conflict is to put economics ahead of political, ideological or humanitarian interests and sympathies, and it seems it is working well, and China found the balace how to work well with the 2 enemies.

The cooperation emerges partly from Chinese and Iranian recognition as fellow heirs to great civilizations and because Iran has emerged as the regional leader in the Middle East. While there is also a shared distrust of the United States' government and its interests, many young Chinese and Iranians at the same time admire certain aspects of American society and culture. There is also Iranian admiration for China's rapid economic growth, and for the most part, their economic contributions to Iran are appreciated and respected.

Some analysts argue that Iran can use its links with China to build more links across Asia while remaining insulated from potential U.S. attack.

Beijing has generally supported the Iran-backed government of Bashar al-Assad in Syria, joining Russia in vetoing several U.N. resolutions condemning Assad's actions in the Syrian civil war, and strongly opposing Western interference in the conflict, arguing that outside intervention would further worsen and complicate the situation. It has also allegedly been increasing military links with Syria in recent years, albeit in a more limited sense than Moscow, partly because of the presence of Uighur militant rebels on the side of the Syrian rebels.

In April 2015, China stated that Iran had been officially accepted as a founding member of its newly founded Asian Infrastructure Investment Bank, with the latter owning 15,808 shares. There has also been recent discussion for Iran to eventually join the Shanghai Cooperation Organisation, of which it is currently an observer state, as a full member.

In 2016, Chinese leader Xi Jinping announced his support for Iran's full membership in SCO during a state visit to Iran.

In July 2019, UN ambassadors from 50 countries, including Iran, have signed a joint letter to the UNHRC defending China's treatment of Uyghurs and other Muslim minority groups in the Xinjiang region.

In January 2020, China condemned the assassination of Qasem Soleimani, with the Chinese Foreign Minister Wang Yi alleging that the targeted killing of an Iranian general in Iraqi territory by the United States was in violation of international law.

In June 2020, Iran was one of 53 countries that backed the Hong Kong national security law at the United Nations.

In late 2022, Iranian Foreign Minister Hossein Amir-Abdollahian was reacting to a joint statement issued by China and states of the Gulf Cooperation Council, which called for peaceful resolution of the islands dispute with the United Arab Emirates. Iran conveyed its “strong discontent” with the GCC-China statement, China later expressed respect for Iran's territorial integrity.

Society
There are several historic social connections between the two states. Although the two societies psychologically identify with one another because they both share the national pride and historical identity that comes along with being the descendants of two great empires and modern successor-states to ancient civilizations, there was limited interaction after the Chinese Revolution in 1949, social interactions improved after the 1960s. Anti-Chinese sentiments in Iran increasing due to China's economic activity and social differences between the two countries.

Ali Motahari and Former President Mahmoud Ahmadinejad expresses concern over China's persecution of Uyghur Muslims.

Even Chinese state-ran news agencies upheld the validity of the internationally controversial election and ultimately attributed any problems that day to terrorists and vandals. They deliberately left out images of Iranian security forces brutalizing the protesters.

About 2,000 Chinese now live in Tehran, and 70 Chinese companies have relocated to Iran.

Intermarriage

Iran and China have a long history of intermarriages, since at least the Tang and mostly taking place in China (so names are in Chinese). Immigrant communities of Persian Muslims in China intermarried with local women, forming what is now the modern Hui people. At the same time, Persian women also intermarried with Chinese men: see Lin Nu, Liu Chang (Southern Han), Wang Zongyan (married Li Shunxian). Mixed descendants include Li Zhi (philosopher), Hu Dahai.

Culture
Recently, Chinese restaurants have appeared in Tehran. In popular culture the Chinese have turned their focus towards Iran in the fields of literature, television and cultural events. These bear witness to China's attempts to create a positive image in order to uphold existing relations and to nurture projected ones. The soft power pipelines, too, that the Iranians have exerted towards China has been received with open arms., In addition, China opened the Confucius institute at University of Tehran and at the University of Mazandaran.

Literature
Li Shunxian is a Persian-Chinese woman who wrote celebrated Chinese poetry during the Tang dynasty.

Ha Dechen and Wang Jingzhai helped translate Persian literature into Chinese. Sadi's works are particularly well-known and have been broadcast on Chinese media.

Linguistics
Mainly through Silk Road trade, Chinese borrowed Middle Persian words for exotic commodities. Oddly, these loanwords are typically themselves loans from a pre-Iranian substrate, e.g. Elamite or BMAC:

Huihuihua is a dialect of Chinese with more Persian and Arabic words.

The Galle Trilingual Inscription is associated with the voyages of Zheng He.

See also

 Foreign relations of Imperial China
 Foreign relations of Iran
 Sogdia
 Iranians in China
 Afghanistan–China relations (parts of Afghanistan historically were part of Persian empires and Greater Iran)
 Shanghai Cooperation Organisation
 Sino-Roman relations
 An Shihkao
 Peroz III
 Narsieh

References

Further reading
 FOR A COMPREHESIVE COMPARATIVE ANALYSIS OF CHINA AND IRANIAN POLITICAL ECONOMY OF DEVELOPMENT SEE:  Mehdi Parvizi Amineh (2022) Why Did China's Rise Succeed and Iran's Fail? the Political Economy of Development in China and Iran, Asian Affairs, 53:1, 28–50, DOI: 10.1080/03068374.2022.2029038 OPENACCES: https://www.tandfonline.com/doi/citedby/10.1080/03068374.2022.2029038?scroll=top&needAccess=true

 
 
 http://www.iranian.com/main/2010/aug/china-and-iran- Article by Nabil Rastani
 Garver, John W. China And Iran: Ancient Partners in a Post-imperial World. University of Washington Press, 2006. 
 "Persian language in Xinjiang" (زبان فارسی در سین کیانگ). Zamir Sa'dollah Zadeh (دکتر ضمیر سعدالله زاد ه). Nameh-i Iran (نامه ایران) V.1. Editor: Hamid Yazdan Parast (حمید یزدان پرست).  Perry–Castañeda Library collection under DS 266 N336 2005.
 John Keefer Douglas, Matthew B. Nelson, and Kevin Schwartz; "Fueling the Dragon's Flame: How China's Energy Demands Affect its Relationships in the Middle East." United States-China Economic and Security Review Commission, October 2006. 
Yellinek, Roie, ET AL, "China’s Soft Power in China-Iran Relations", The Journal for Interdisciplinary Middle Eastern Studies, DOI: 10.26351/JIMES/4/7.
Yellinek, Roie, A Reappraisal of China-Iran Ties After US JCPOA Withdrawal, Publication: China Brief Volume: 18 Issue: 14.
Yellinek, Roie, "Soft Power and SPPD in China Iran Relationship", Journal of Balkan and Near Eastern Studies, DOI: 10.1080/19448953.2022.2037959.

External links
Chinese of Arab and Persian descent

Historical
 China and Iran | Iranian.com- Article by Nabil Rastani
 "Iran in Central Asia"
 The Sassanids in China
 Chinese-Iranian relations
 Chinese-Iranian relations i. In Pre-Islamic Times
 THE LAST SassanianS IN CHINA
 For more on Iranian-Chinese relations in history see Encyclopædia Iranica p. 424–460.

Modern
 "Iran's New Alliance With China Could Cost U.S. Leverage". By Robin Wright, Washington Post Staff Writer, Wednesday, 17 November 2004; Page A21
 Chinese Arms Transfers to Iran
 Photos of Jiang Zemin at Persepolis

 
Iran
Bilateral relations of Iran